San Kamphaeng or Sankamphaeng may refer to:
San Kamphaeng district in Chiang Mai Province, northern Thailand
San Kamphaeng subdistrict, in the district
Sankamphaeng Range, a mountain range separating Eastern Thailand from Isan